In art, frottages (from French frotter, "to rub", Rubbing) is a surrealist and "automatic" method of creative production developed by Max Ernst.

Details
In frottage, the artist places a piece of paper over an uneven surface, then marks the paper with a drawing tool (such as a pastel or pencil), thus creating a rubbing. The drawing can be left as it is or used as the basis for further refinement. While superficially similar to brass rubbing and other forms of rubbing intended to reproduce an existing subject, and in fact sometimes being used as an alternative term for it, frottage implies using this rubbing technique to create an original image.

It was developed by surrealist artist Max Ernst in 1925. Ernst was inspired by an ancient wooden floor where the grain of the planks had been accentuated by many years of scrubbing. The patterns of the graining suggested strange images to him. He captured these by laying sheets of paper on the floor and then rubbing over them with a soft pencil.

See also
 Rubbing
 Surrealist techniques

References
 

Surrealist techniques